Warren G. Phillips (born 1954) is an American science teacher who was inducted into the National Teachers Hall of Fame in 2010.

Career
Phillips obtained a B.A. in Earth Sciences, an M.A.T. in Teaching Physical Sciences, and an M. ED. in Instructional Technology from Bridgewater State University.

Phillips taught science for the Plymouth Public Schools in Plymouth, Massachusetts from 1975 to 2010, and for Silver Lake Schools in Kingston, Massachusetts from 2011 to 2016.  As a middle school science teacher, he organized a three-day outdoor education trip for all Plymouth seventh graders for 25 years. He helped obtain grants to establish and maintain a TV studio within the school. His classes initiated and organized a recycling program for Plymouth Schools. He was a contributing writer for the Prentice-Hall Science Explorer series and has written curriculum for Northeastern University's Project SEED and the Plymouth Public Schools science curriculum. He is a board certified teacher by the National Board for Professional Teaching Standards (NBPTS). In 2008, he received an Earthwatch fellowship to study elephant behavior at Tsavo East National Park in Kenya.

Phillips was selected as the grand prize winner of the Time Magazine Chevy Malibu Teaching Excellence Awards in 2002. He was selected a finalist in Massachusetts in 2001, 2002, and 2003 for the Presidential Award for Excellence in Teaching Math and Science. He was selected as the Disney Middle School Teacher of The Year in 2004. Phillips was selected to the USA Today All-USA Teaching Team in 2006. In 2007, Phillips was selected into the Massachusetts Science Teachers Hall Of Fame   Phillips won the PBS Teachers Innovation Award in 2010.

Since 2005, Phillips has traveled around the U.S. doing keynote speeches and teacher professional development for Developing Minds, Inc., Bridgewater State University, Blue Ribbon Schools of Excellence, and local school districts. He is past president of the nonprofit STEP Foundation, which has funded an observatory, established teaching awards, and supported students and teachers in science endeavors. In 2013, Phillips received the Nicholas P. Tillinghast Award for Achievement in the Field Of Education from Bridgewater State University. Since March 2019, Phillips has been an outreach coordinator for the Pegasus Springs Education Collective, a nonprofit dedicated to improving education. 

Phillips is co-author with Marcia Tate of the teaching strategies book Science Worksheets Don't Grow Dendrites. Phillips is also the author of the teaching guidebook Oh, The Lives You'll Change! A Teacher's Story. He conducts brain-based STEM professional development for teachers.

Personal life 
Phillips is the son of Joseph E. and Eleanore M. Phillips. He is married to Karen ( Friberg) and has two children, Jeff and Kristin.

Phillips was a guest on The_Tony_Danza_Show_(2004_talk_show) , after winning his Disney Middle School Teacher of The Year Award that same year. Phillips also appeared as a contestant on Who Wants to Be a Millionaire in 2005.

Publications 
Oh, The Lives You'll Change! A Teacher's Story. Sing Along Science Publisher, Warren G. Phillips (2020) 
100 Brain-Friendly Lessons For Unforgettable Teaching and Learning K-8. Corwin Press, Marcia L. Tate, Lisa Lee, Simone Willingham, Deborah Daniel, and Warren G. Phillips (2020) 
100 Brain-Friendly Lessons For Unforgettable Teaching and Learning 9-12. Corwin Press, Marcia L. Tate, Lisa Lee, Victoria Hanabury, Deborah Daniel, and Warren G. Phillips (2020) 
Science Worksheets Don't Grow Dendrites 20 Instructional Strategies That Engage The Brain. Corwin Press, Marcia L. Tate & Warren G. Phillips (2011) 
Today I Made A Difference. Adams Media, Joseph W. Underwood, editor (2009) 
Exemplary Science In Grades 5-8, Standards-based Success Stories. NSTA Press, Robert E Yeager, editor (2006) 
Science Explorer Cells And Heredity. Prentice-Hall, Donald Cronkite, Ph.D. (2002) 
Sing-A-Long Science. 3 CDs of Science Songs (Original, The Sequel, The Second Sequel), Disc Makers (1999, 2001, 2002)
The Science Secret A science Glee-like musical using Sing-A-Long Science songs. Independent publishers (2011)

References

External links

 Bridgewater Magazine Winter 2007 https://vc.bridgew.edu/cgi/viewcontent.cgi?article=1009&context=br_mag
 Mr. Phillips' Science & Service Learning Page http://www.wphillips.com/
 Education World® Article by Cara Bafile 05/06/2008 http://www.educationworld.com/a_curr/teacher_feature/teacher_feature180.shtml
 Old Colony Memorial article by Bernie Beck Thu Jun 12, 2008, http://www.wphillips.com/Recycle/Green%20Team%20article%2008.pdf PCIS Green Team A Grand Prize Winner

1954 births
Living people
Schoolteachers from Massachusetts
People from Weymouth, Massachusetts
People from Plymouth, Massachusetts
People from Halifax, Massachusetts
Bridgewater State University alumni
Educators from Massachusetts